José Biller is an Uruguayan born, American neurologist specialized in stroke and cerebrovascular disorders, currently professor and chairperson of the department of neurology at Loyola University Chicago, Stritch School of Medicine, the Editor-in-Chief of Journal of Stroke & Cerebrovascular Diseases, a Foreign Academic Correspondent of the National Academy of Medicine in Uruguay, a Fellow of the Mexican Academy of Neurology and an Honorary Member of the Chilean Society of Neurology, Psychiatry and Neurosurgery. 

Biller served as Director of the American Board of Psychiatry and Neurology (ABPN) from 1994 to 2001, and President of the ABPN in 2001, and currently holds the title of Emeritus Director of the ABPN. 

Biller earned his medical degree from the School of Medicine at the University of the Republic in Montevideo, Uruguay. He completed Residency in Neurology at Loyola University Chicago and a Cerebrovascular Research Fellowship at Wake Forest University, Bowman Gray School of Medicine. 

Biller has given more than 700 lectures and presentations at scientific meetings around the world, is an author of more than 600 scientific articles and studies, and has edited and/or authored more than 30 books. He was the recipient of the American Neurological Association (ANA) Distinguished Neurology Teacher Award in 2013 and was awarded the 2020 A.B.Baker Lifetime Award for Teaching in Neurology by the American Academy of Neurology (AAN).

References

Year of birth missing (living people)
Living people
Loyola University Chicago faculty
American neurologists
Medical journal editors